Kandaramanickam  is a village in Sivaganga district, in the state of Tamil Nadu, India.

Geography

It is 18 kilometers away from Karaikudi and 8 km away from Thirupatthur. This Kandramanickam falls under Sivaganga District, in closer proximity to Madurai. 

The village Kandiramanickam [10°54'33.48"N 79°30'56.97"E] lies 6 km east of Nachiyar Koil and is midway between Nachiyar koil and Marudancheri.

Transports 
Kandaramanickam is connected by public transport from both Karaikudi and Thirupatthur.  Both these places are well connected by road transport and Karaikudi is connected by rail as well. 
Cities and towns in Sivaganga district

 Villages in Sivaganga district